Papilio torquatus, the torquatus swallowtail, is a swallowtail butterfly in the subfamily Papilioninae. It is found from northern Argentina to Mexico.

Adults strongly resemble Papilio garleppi.

The larvae feed on the leaves of Citrus species. Full-grown larvae are mottled in dull tones of brown, greenish-yellow and whitish. It resembles a bird dropping.

Subspecies
P. t. torquatus (Venezuela, Guianas to Brazil (Amazonas), Ecuador, Peru, Bolivia)
P. t. mazai Beutelspacher, 1977 (Mexico, El Salvador)
P. t. tolmides Godman & Salvin, 1890 (Panama, Costa Rica)
P. t. tolus Godman & Salvin, 1890 (Mexico, Guatemala)
P. t. leptalea Rothschild & Jordan, 1906 (western Ecuador)
P. t. polybius Swainson, 1823 (Brazil (Minas Gerais, Rio de Janeiro, Mato Grosso), Paraguay, Argentina)
P. t. jeani (Brown & Lamas, 1994) (Colombia, western Venezuela)

References
Lewis, H.L., (1974) Butterflies of the World  Page 25, figure 12 (male), figure 13 (female).

External links

Butterflies and Moths of North America
Learn About Butterflies
Butterflies of Sangay National Park

torquatus
Papilionidae of South America
Butterflies described in 1777